Ochkurovka is a rural locality (a selo) and the administrative center of Ochkurovskoye Rural Settlement, Nikolayevsky District, Volgograd Oblast, Russia. The population was 1,232 as of 2010. There are 18 streets.

Geography 
Ochkurovka is located on Transvolga, on the east bank of the Volgograd Reservoir, on Caspian Depression, 6 km southwest of Nikolayevsk (the district's administrative centre) by road. Nikolayevsk is the nearest rural locality.

References 

Rural localities in Nikolayevsky District, Volgograd Oblast